Roaring Cliffs is the high and precipitous rock cliffs just northward of Kutschin Peak on the west side of Nilsen Plateau, Queen Maud Mountains. The name was proposed by William Long, geologist with a United States Antarctic Research Program (USARP) field party that visited the area in the 1963–64 season. The name is descriptive of the sound made by the wind here; standing in the quiet, windless valley below, a roaring noise like an approaching train can be heard high up on the cliffs.

Cliffs of the Ross Dependency
Amundsen Coast